Eduardo Verchez Garcia (May 2, 1929 – June 20, 2019), known colloquially as Manoy, was a Filipino actor, television personality, film director and producer. With almost 700 film and television roles and a career spanning seven decades, he is widely regarded as the "greatest Filipino actor of all time". He had the highest number of appearances in Philippine films, portraying a variety of roles.

Garcia's best regarded works as an actor include Beast of the Yellow Night (1971), The Woman Hunt (1972), Deathrow (2000), The Debut (2001), Abakada... Ina (2001), Bwakaw (2012), and Rainbow's Sunset (2018), which marked his last film appearance in his lifetime. Later in his career, he starred in television programs including Little Nanay (2015–2016) and FPJ's Ang Probinsyano (2016–2019).

Garcia received numerous awards throughout his career, garnering a total of 43 wins and 38 nominations from notable award-giving bodies. He is the only individual to be inducted in three categories in the FAMAS Hall of Fame: for Best Actor, Best Supporting Actor, and Best Director. Garcia is the only Filipino to receive the Asian Film Award for Best Actor.

Early life and education
Eddie Garcia was born as Eduardo Verchez Garcia on May 2, 1929, in Juban, Sorsogon to Antonio Garcia and Vicenta Verchez. He grew up in a farm in Naga with his four siblings named Mila, Efren, Menchu, and Santiago, raised by his grandparents. Garcia's family was among the descendants of Spanish settlers. Garcia's grandfather, who was a captain in the Spanish army when he came to the Philippines in 1870, married a lady from Pampanga and decided to settle in Naga.

He spent his elementary days at Sorsogon Elementary School and transferred to Manila, he finished high school at San Beda College and took A.B. Psychology at college in the same campus for three years.

Career
Garcia served with the Philippine Scouts right after World War II and was stationed as a military policeman in Okinawa, Japan. After returning, he was asked by his commanding officer to come back and enlist for another duty overseas but he met a friend who persuaded him to join show business.

Career beginnings
Garcia first tried out his luck auditioning for the late great director Manuel Conde and got accepted for his first role in the feature film Siete Infantes de Lara in 1949 starting out his acting career. After his first acting stint, he appeared in the film Kahit ang Mundo'y Magunaw in the same year. Among his films during his first two years in the industry were Huling Patak ng Dugo and Kilabot ng Langit shown both in 1950.

At first, due to his Hispanic features and bearing, he was typecast into playing villain roles. He did the film Contravida in 1955, directed by Olive La Torre. He was so effective as a villain that he won his first FAMAS awards for Best Supporting Actor for three straight years from 1957 to 1959 for the movies Taga sa Bato (1957), Condenado (1958) and Tanikalang Apoy (1959), respectively. He is the only individual to garner a three-straight victory in any award from that certain institution

He directed his first movie Karugtong ng Kahapon in 1961, and also directed another notable film Historia un Amor in 1963. In 1969, Garcia directed Pinagbuklod ng Langit, a biopic about then President Ferdinand Marcos which won him his first Best Director award from FAMAS.

Rise to prominence and critical acclaim
During the 1970s to the early 1980s,  Garcia was an integral part of the film movement from the period of what is commonly called the "Second Golden Age of Philippine Cinema". He was in National Artist & director Lino Brocka's Tinimbang Ka Ngunit Kulang (1974), Ganito Kami Noon, Paano Kayo Ngayon (1976) and Miguelito: Ang Batang Rebelde (1985), among other films. He went back to directing and produced Atsay in 1978 which won Best Picture at the Metro Manila Film Festival, starring Nora Aunor.

Garcia directed Magdusa Ka in 1986 and bagged back-to-back Luna Awards for Best Director for another film he directed a year after entitled Saan Nagtatago and Pag-ibig in 1987. He also acted opposite Fernando Poe, Jr. in Kapag Puno na ang Salop (1987) and its sequel, Ako ang Huhusga (1989) which Poe also directed. The Metro Manila Film Festival Award for Best Director was conferred to him for the film Imortal in 1989. He became a FAMAS Hall of Famer as a director in 1991., and was named "All Time Favorite Actor of RP Movies" at the Guillermo Mendoza Memorial Scholarship Foundation on March 21, 1992. Garcia did the film  Boyong Mañalac: Hoodlum Terminator as the lead actor in 1991 and won the FAMAS Best Actor plum for the film a year after, winning multiple times and non-consecutively in the next coming years of the decade for different movies including Sambahin Ang Ngalan Mo (1998), Bakit May Kahapon Pa? (1996) and Mariano Mison... NBI (1997).

In 1998, he earned the Film Academy of the Philippines (FAP) Lifetime Achievement Award.  He starred in Raymond Red's Anino (Shadow, 2000) which won the grand prize in the short film category at the Cannes Film Festival in 2000. Garcia played an aged convict who shielded a young prisoner from harsh prison life and was bestowed the Best Actor award for the movie Death Row in 2000.

Garcia directed Abakada... Ina in 2001 and won another Luna Award as Best Director. He was awarded the Best Actor for the movie Mano Po in 2002. He earned his first Best Actor in a Drama Series award at the 2002 Star Awards for portraying the role of Leandro Montemayor, the fictional Philippine President in the television drama series Kung Mawawala Ka from GMA 7.  He earned the Urian Award for Pangunahing Aktor (Best Actor) for the movie Death Row in 2000. In 2005, he played the lead role (a senior citizen coming to terms with his mortality) in Rica Arevalo's ICU Bed #7—an entry in the first Cinemalaya Philippine Independent Film Festival—for which he won best actor. The Natatanging Gawad Urian award was bestowed upon him in 2006.

Later years

In 2010, Mark Hartley's documentary film Machete Maidens Unleashed! premiered. Garcia is interviewed in the documentary that explores exploitation films made in the Philippines in the 1970s and 1980s.

Garcia did the independent venture titled Bwakaw in 2012, directed by Jun Robles Lana, a young Palanca award winner and director, gave Garcia the script, and was worried that a big star like him would decline the role as the crew feared they could not afford him. The director admitted his concern to Garcia, who already read the script. To the director's surprise, Garcia nonchalantly asked, "So when do we start shooting?" Garcia earned his first international film award at the 55th Asia-Pacific Film Festival as the lead actor for the movie on December 15, 2012, garnering the Asian Film Award for Best Actor, the only Filipino so far to win the award.

Early in 2013, Garcia was awarded the first Dolphy Lifetime Achievement Award – Ulirang Alagad ng Sining during the Entertainment Press Society's Golden Screen TV Awards. Also that year, Garcia was interviewed in the documentary The Search for Weng Weng.

In August 2014, Garcia was included in two lists: Inside Showbiz magazine's list of five best of the living Filipino actors, and the Philippines' Yes! Magazine'''s list of 2014's 100 Most Beautiful Stars.

In 2015, he appeared in the television series program Little Nanay. He transferred to ABS-CBN and portrayed Don Emilio on the longest-running action television show in the history of Philippine television entitled FPJ's Ang Probinsyano with Coco Martin from 2016 until 2019. Garcia returned to GMA Network and did Rosang Agimat until the accident leading to his coma and eventual death occurred during the shooting of this show.

Garcia continued to actively appear on films when he reached the age of 89 in 2018 and emphasized that "retirement was never in my vocabulary." Garcia's last notable works were ML, an entry of 14th Cinemalaya Independent Film Festival which he portrayed as Colonel dela Cruz, a retired METROCOM colonel suffering from Alzheimer's disease, leading him to believe that he is still living in the days of the Marcos dictatorship, with his performance on his movie won Gawad Urian's Best Actor in the following year during the time Garcia went comatose after his accident, and Hintayan ng Langit, an entry of 2018 QCinema International Film Festival starring opposite Gina Pareño, as Manolo who was reunited with his ex-girlfriend in Purgatory. The said movie was also available on Netflix in the following year during also the time Garcia went comatose after the accident. Garcia also portrayed on his last movie appearance during his lifetime, Rainbow's Sunset as Ramon, an entry  in the 2018 Metro Manila Film Festival directed by Joel Lamangan, as a gay senator who only came out when he reached elder age. Garcia was also nominated for as Best Actor but lost to Dennis Trillo. Garcia had a special participation role in the comedy film Sanggano, Sanggago't Sanggwapo released on September 4, 2019, three months after his death. Garcia didn't get to finish shooting his required scenes in the movie due to the accident and it marked his last appearance in a movie.

Personal life
Garcia kept most of his life private, viewing his acting profession and personal life as separate. He lived a relatively simple life without any luxury cars and expensive equipment. Throughout his career, he had been known for his professionalism, and evaded intrigues and controversies linking him to any of his fellow co-stars. Marichu Maceda, a film producer, described Garcia as "a disciplined and independent person, carrying things on his own without needing assistants or managers despite being popular".

Garcia was in a domestic partnership with Lilibeth Romero for 33 years. Before Romero, Garcia was married to Lucilla Scharnberg, who died of cancer in 1995. He and Scharnberg produced three children: Eduardo "Eddieboy" Jr. (1951–1973), Erwin (March 13, 1956–March 13, 2021), and Elizabeth (nicknamed Lisa). Eduardo "Eddieboy" Jr died in a motorcycle accident at the age of 22; Garcia called it "the biggest tragedy of his life", feeling quite guilty as the motorcycle his son had ridden was his gift to him. Elizabeth died of a heart attack in 1996. His other daughter lives in San Diego, California.

Garcia said that he originally had aspirations to be a soldier or a lawyer, "Acting is just a job. It's an honest way to make a living." Beyond acting, he was also passionate about target shooting as a sport. He was a skilled marksman, having once been a trained soldier. Garcia also campaigned for the Ako Bicol's party-list representation in the House of Representatives in the 2019 elections as the regional group's primary endorser.

Garcia maintained a healthy lifestyle through exercise, vitamin supplements, and healthy diet, stressing he preferred fish and vegetables more than meat. While still being active as an actor and director when he turned 90, he shared that he still had an active sex life and went to the gym to remain healthy. He described his lifestyle as "everything in moderation: food, work, even fitness, and workout".

Death
On June 8, 2019, Garcia was rushed to Mary Johnston Hospital in Tondo, Manila, after tripping on a cable wire and hitting his head on the pavement during a shoot for Rosang Agimat, an upcoming television series produced by GMA Network. Unconscious, he was later transferred to the ICU at the Makati Medical Center the following day. The actual incident was captured on video. Initial reports stated that Garcia allegedly suffered a heart attack on set according to his family, but was later found to have suffered a neck and cervical fracture due to the fall, contrary to earlier reports. 

Garcia's family released a statement contradicting a report that said that Garcia suffered a heart attack. Garcia's family called the initial report "fake news" and said that the actor tripped on a cable wire instead during the shooting and was healthy and fit prior to the incident. A CT scan showed that his brain was in a normal state, ruling out the possibility that he suffered a stroke. The fracture left him in a coma, and on June 15, his family agreed to place him on "do-not-resuscitate" status. On June 19, he had minimal signs of brain activity while remaining dependent on a ventilator. A day later, he was pronounced dead at 4:55 pm (GMT+8) (June 20, 2019), at the age of 90. In accordance with his last wishes, Garcia's remains were cremated and placed inside an olive green urn immediately after his death. His wake was held at the Heritage Memorial Park in Taguig.

Aftermath
Garcia's accident and eventual death became an issue as there was no standby medical team or ambulance at the set of Rosang Agimat. The unconscious Garcia was lifted from the pavement by non-medical personnel, carrying him to a passing taxicab. Several people, including his wife Lilibeth, stressed that the accident could have been prevented if only the GMA management took safety precautions. The Directors' Guild of the Philippines Inc. (DGPI) referred to Garcia's death as "a sad and urgent reminder to the film and television industries that safety protocols at work and on set are of paramount importance". The Department of Labor and Employment (DOLE) and the Occupational Safety and Health Center (OSHC) started an investigation regarding the circumstances of Garcia's accident which led to his death. The OSHC found some OSH-related violations on the part of GMA Network based on the uploaded online video of Garcia's accident, such as lack of first-aid, medical supplies, and a stretcher. They also observed how Garcia was "carried by personnel using bare hands". On September 4, the DOLE added that GMA Network failed to submit an incident report within 24 hours after the accident. On December 23, the DOLE fined GMA Network an amount of  because of the incident. The network submitted an appeal in response to the ruling.

Acting style and reputation
Garcia is best known for portraying villain roles. Being a critically acclaimed villain portraying characters that are usually loathed or feared, Garcia said in an interview that he had been attacked by a fan at one point in his career, hurting him with an umbrella because his character raped Gloria Romero's character in a role he portrayed for a Sampaguita Pictures production. He did not lash out at the fan, however, believing that "he did a good job in portraying it". He is also known for his trademark humorous lines mostly in action films or comedy films. He also earned the title "The Sean Connery of the Philippines".

Garcia gained a reputation as one of the Philippine film industry's most reliable, versatile and competent actors and has influenced a lot of prominent actors like Coco Martin, whom he worked with for three years at one of the longest-running television shows in the history of Philippine television. Television presenter Julius Babao refers him as "a true icon of the Philippine movie industry". Journalist Ruel Mendoza dubbed him as the Ama ng Pelikulang Pilipino.

Filmography

Garcia appeared in a total of 670 films and television shows as an actor, and directed a total of 37 films in his whole career. He had the highest number of appearances on films & television shows by a Filipino actor.

Awards and legacy

Garcia won multiple awards for films he directed. Miguel Escobar from Esquire'' called Garcia, "a legendary actor-director". Korina Sanchez called Garcia "above and beyond the quota in his contributions to pop culture and the Philippine film industry".

Garcia collected a huge number of awards throughout his career, but he said he did not make movies aiming for awards. He is the only Filipino to receive the Asian Film Award for Best Actor, he also racked up awards from other film festivals, receiving Luna Awards, as well as the Metro Manila Film Festival Awards. Garcia was the most awarded and nominated person in the long history of the Filipino Academy of Movie Arts and Sciences (FAMAS) Awards. He garnered a total of 43 wins and 38 nominations (13 for Best Supporting Actor, 12 for Best Actor and 11 for Best Director). Out of these, he got six Best Supporting Actor wins, five Best Actor wins, five Best Director wins, three Hall of Fame Awards, one Lifetime Achievement Award and the Fernando Poe Jr. Memorial Award. He was awarded his first FAMAS Award in 1957 and his last FAMAS, a Hall of Fame for Best Actor, in 2003.

Garcia's stepson, House representative Michael Romero, said he would propose an  "Eddie Garcia Law", in honor of Garcia, which seeks to "safeguard the welfare and well being of all actors working in the television and/or in the movie industries" by compelling production outfits to grant mandatory insurance, providing for working hours in TV and movie production, and establishing medical and safety protocols and emergency procedures.

In June 2019, the Partylist Coalition Foundation Inc. announced that it intends to nominate Garcia for posthumous conferment of the Order of National Artists.

References

External links
 
 
 

1929 births
2019 deaths
Bicolano actors
Bicolano people
Filipino male film actors
Filipino film directors
Filipino male television actors
Filipino male comedians
Filipino military personnel
Filipino people of Spanish descent
Filipino people of Kapampangan descent
People from Sorsogon
ABS-CBN personalities
GMA Network personalities
TV5 (Philippine TV network) personalities
Accidental deaths from falls
Accidental deaths in the Philippines
20th-century Filipino male actors
21st-century Filipino male actors
Best Actor Asian Film Award winners